John Ramage may refer to:

John Ramage (artist) (1748–1802), Irish American artist
John Ramage (ice hockey) (born 1991), American ice hockey player